Craugastor crassidigitus is a species of frog in the family Craugastoridae.
It is found in Colombia, Costa Rica, Panama, and possibly Nicaragua.
Its natural habitats are subtropical or tropical moist lowland forests, subtropical or tropical moist montane forests, arable land, pastureland, plantations, and heavily degraded former forest.

References

External links

crassidigitus
Amphibians of Central America
Amphibians of Colombia
Amphibians described in 1952
Taxonomy articles created by Polbot